The 1986 Wales rugby union tour of South Pacific was a series of matches played by Wales national rugby union team in the south pacific islands.

The matches with Tonga ad Samoa was the first official matches against Wales with the official status of "full international" assigned by Welsh Rugby Union

Results 
Scores and results list Wales' points tally first.

Notes

Wales tour
Wales national rugby union team tours
Rugby union tours of Fiji
Rugby union tours of Samoa
Rugby union tours of Tonga
tour
1986 in Tongan sport
1986 in Samoan rugby union
1986 in Fijian rugby union